The 1966–67 Irish Cup was the 87th edition of the premier knock-out cup competition in Northern Irish football. 

Crusaders won the cup for the 1st time, defeating the holders Glentoran 3–1 in the final at Windsor Park.

Results

First round

|}

Replay

|}

Second replay

|}

Quarter-finals

|}

Semi-finals

|}

Final

References

External links
The Rec.Sport.Soccer Statistics Foundation - Northern Ireland - Cup Finals

Irish Cup seasons
1966–67 in Northern Ireland association football
1966–67 domestic association football cups